Certified Live is a live album by Dave Mason, which was released as a double-LP in 1976. The album was recorded at the Universal Amphitheatre in Universal City, California

Track listing

Personnel
 Dave Mason – guitar, vocals
 Mike Finnigan – keyboards, vocals, lead vocal on "Goin' Down Slow"
 Dr. Rick Jaeger – drums
 Gerald Johnson – bass
 Jim Kruegar – guitar, vocals

Production
 Executive producer – Michael Dilbeck
 Management – Jason Cooper
 Recording – Walley Heider Recording
 Engineers – Bruce Botnick, Doug Botnick
 Mixing – Ron Nevison
 Art direction – Ron Coro
 Album design – Tom Steele
 Photography – Jim Greene

Releases
 CD	Certified Live Blue Note	 1992
 CD	Certified Live One Way Records	 1995
 CD	Certified Live EMI Music Distribution / Sony Music Entertainment	 2006
 CD	Certified Live Sony Japan	 2010

References

Dave Mason albums
1976 live albums
Columbia Records live albums
Albums produced by Dave Mason